Bessemer is a populated place in Westmoreland County, Pennsylvania, United States at coordinates  	40.1281278,-79.5550387 within Mount Pleasant. A road named Bessemer Road is located near the coordinates for the populated place listed in the Geographic Names Information System database.

References

See also
Bessemer

Populated places in Westmoreland County, Pennsylvania